Inozemtsev is a Russian masculine surname, its feminine counterpart is Inozemtseva. It may refer to
Nikolay Inozemtsev (1921–1982), Russian economist and journalist
Vladislav Inozemtsev, Russian academician
Volodymyr Inozemtsev (born 1964–2020), Ukrainian triple jumper

Russian-language surnames